The Cauca Valley dry forests is a tropical dry broadleaf forest ecoregion in Colombia.

Location 
The Cauca Valley is nestled between the Cordillera Occidental and Cordillera Central in the northern Andes. These ranges create a rain shadow, which makes the Cauca Valley drier than the surrounding forests. The Cauca Valley dry forests lie below 1000 meters elevation; the higher slopes are occupied by the distinct Cauca Valley montane forests. Most of these forests have been cleared for agriculture over the years making it one of the most critically endangered ecoregions in Colombia. Laguna de Sonso Nature Reserve has a small area of protected forest.

Ecology 

The ecoregion is part of the  Tumbesian-Andean Valleys Dry Forests global ecoregion, which holds six terrestrial ecoregions: Tumbes–Piura dry forests, Ecuadorian dry forests, Patía Valley dry forests, Magdalena Valley dry forests, Cauca Valley dry forests and Marañón dry forests. 
The fauna and flora of the global ecoregion have high levels of endemism.

Flora 
The main plant communities are open woodland, deciduous dry forest, evergreen dry forest, riparian forest, arid scrub and wetlands. The natural vegetation has been almost completely displaced by human activities, chiefly agriculture.

Fauna 
Three endemic or near-endemic birds found in the ecoregion are the white-chested swift (Cypseloides lemosi), grayish piculet (Picumnus granadensis), apical flycatcher (Myiarchus apicalis).

Human use 
The Cauca Valley dry forests have been mostly converted to agricultural fields. The city of Cali lies in the ecoregion.

References

Bibliography 

 
 

Ecoregions of Colombia
Ecoregions of the Andes
Neotropical dry broadleaf forests
Andean forests
Tropical Andes

Natural history of Colombia